Rangunia is an upazila of Chattogram District in Chattogram Division, Bangladesh.

Geography

Rangunia Upazila is located in between 22°18' and 22°37' north latitudes and in between 91°58' and 92°08' east longitudes. It has 46,176 households and a total area of 347.72 km2.

It is bounded by Chandanaish Upazila on the south; Patiya Upazila, Boalkhali Upazila, Raozan Upazila & Kawkhali Upazila of Rangamati District on the west; Kawkhali Upazila of Rangamati District on the north and Kaptai Upazila & Rajasthali Upazila of Rangamati District and Bandarban Sadar Upazila on the east. Rangunia is the administrative headquarter of this upazila.

Main river: Karnaphuli, Ichamoti.

Population
According to the 2011 Bangladesh census, total population of Rangunia Upazila was 340000; male 169596, female 170404; Muslim 78%, Hindu 15%, Buddhist 6% and others 1%. Indigenous communities such as chakma and marma belong to this upazila. Total Voter 240915; male 124363 & female 116552.

History  
Chakma kings (Shukdev Roy, Sher Daulat Khan, Jan Baksh Khan, Tabbar Khan, Jabbar Khan, Dharam Baksh Khan, Rani Kalindi, Harish Chandra Rai and others) ruled this area since 1757. Chakma King Harish Chandra transferred his capital from Rajanagar of Rangunia to Rangamati in 1874.

Points of interest

Tourists spots 
 Sheikh Russel Aviary Park
 Rahmania Islamic Complex
 Baitul Musharraf Shahi Jame Masjid
 Remnants of the Chakma Rajbari (Shukbilash, Padua)
 Mahamuni Buddhist Monastery
 Tea garden (Agunia, Kodala, Thandachhari).

Archaeological heritage & relics 
 Rahmania Islamic Complex
 Baitul Musharraf Shahi Jame Masjid
 Pagla Mama Dargah (19th century)

Administration
Rangunia Thana was formed on 24 January 1962 and it was turned into an upazila in 1983. Municipality was formed on 4 July 2000.

Rangunia Upazila is divided into Rangunia Municipality and 15 union parishads: Betagi, Chandraghona, Dakshin Rajanagar, Hosnabad, Islampur, Kodala, Lalanagar, Mariumnagar, Padua, Parua, Pomara, Rajanagar, Rangunia, Sharafbhata, and Silak. The union parishads are subdivided into 73 mauzas and 138 villages.

Rangunia Municipality is subdivided into 9 wards and 22 mahallas.

 Perliamentery Area: 284 Chittagong-7 (including Shreepur-Kharandweep Union of Boalkhali Upazila)
 Member of Perliament: D. Hasan Mahmud
 Municipality chairman: Shahjahan Shikdar
 Upazila Chairman: Shajan Kumar Talukder
 Vice Chairman: Shafiqul Islam (Independent)
 Woman Vice Chairman: Rehena Begum
 Upazila Nirbahi Officer (UNO): Mohammad Arif uddin

Infrastructure

Communication Facilities 
 Chittagong-Rangamati Highway
 Chittagong-Kaptai Highway
 Chandraghona-Bandarban Highway
 Mariamnagar-Ranirhat Link Road
 Rowazarhat-Ranirhat Link Road
 Godown-Padua Link Road
 Godown-Boalkhali Link Road

Health centres  
Upazila health complex 1, family planning centre 11, satellite clinic 2.

Religious Institutions 
Mosque 359, Temple 42, Tomb 3, Pagoda 41, Sacred place 1.

Education

Rangunia Upazila had an average literacy rate of 70.75%.

There are 9 colleges, 40 secondary schools, 25 madrasas, 179 primary school and many other registered and kindergartens in the upazila.

Colleges 
 Rangunia Govt. College
 Rangunia Women College
 North Rangunia Degree College
 Rajanagar Ranirhat Degree College
 Syeda Selima Qader Chowdhury Degree College
 South Rangunia Padua College
 M Shah Alam Chowdhury Degree College
 Hasina Jamal Degree College
 Shilok Balika Mohabidhyaloy
 Rangunia Alamsha Para Alia Madrasha
 Pomra Jameul Ulum Degree Madrasha

According to Banglapedia, Pomara High School, founded in 1928, Rangunia Ideal Multilateral Pilot High School (1915), Rangunia Khilmogal Rashik High School (1926), Rangunia Majumdarkhil High School (1927), and Uttar Rangunia High School (1942) are notable secondary schools.

Economics 
Main sources of income are: Agriculture 39.71%, non-agricultural labourer 4.30%, industry 0.58%, commerce 16.24%, transport and communication 3.57%, service 12.31%, construction 1.03%, religious service 0.49%, rent and remittance 10.91% and others 10.86%.

Newspapers & periodicals 
 Ranguniar Khobor (weekly)
 Rupali Rangunia
 Ashar Alo
 Rangunia Sangbad
 Rangunianews24.com

In War of Liberation 
In 1971, encounters were held between the freedom fighters and the Pak army at Ranirhat, Rowajarhat and Rangunia. The Pak army conducted looting, burning, rape and mass killing in various places of the upazila.

 Marks of the War of Liberation 
Mass Grave - 2
 Memorial Monument - 3 (Rangunia College, Rangunia Ideal Multilateral Pilot High School and Ichakhali).

Notable residents
 Saranangkar Thera, Buddhist monk, began construction of Gayanasarana Buddhism Meditation Center in Falaharia village in 2012.

See also
Rangunia
Upazilas of Bangladesh
Districts of Bangladesh
Divisions of Bangladesh

References